Magnus Gustafsson was the defending champion, but lost in the first round this year.

Magnus Larsson won the title, defeating Petr Korda 6–4, 4–6, 6–1 in the final.

Seeds

  Michael Stich (quarterfinals)
  Petr Korda (final)
  Magnus Gustafsson (first round)
  Karel Nováček (quarterfinals)
  Richard Krajicek (first round)
  Aaron Krickstein (second round)
  Omar Camporese (second round)
  Goran Prpić (second round)

Draw

Finals

Top half

Bottom half

External links
 Singles draw

 

Singles